Magos, espadas y rosas (Wizards, swords and roses) is the second album by Argentine heavy metal band Rata Blanca. The album was released in 1990 by Polydor Records and is the best-selling heavy metal album from Argentina with over one million copies sold.

The album was originally issued on vinyl LP and cassette and featured seven tracks. Two bonus tracks were added to the CD release, "Preludio Obsesivo" and "Otoño Medieval", both of which were previously included on their self-titled debut from 1988. It is the band's first album with Adrián Barilari on lead vocals.

Track listing
All songs are written by Walter Giardino, except where noted.

"La Leyenda del Hada y el Mago" [The Legend of the Fairy and the Wizard] (Roxana Giardino, W. Giardino) – 5:24
"Mujer Amante" [Lover Woman] (W. Giardino, Adrián Barilari) – 6:05
"El Beso de la Bruja" [Witch's Kiss] – 4:19
"Haz Tu Jugada" [Make Your Move] – 6:22
"El Camino del Sol" [The Path of the Sun] – 9:28
"Días Duros" [Hard Days] (Carlos Perigo, W. Giardino) – 7:24 
"Porque es tan difícil amar" [Because It's So Hard to Love] (instrumental) – 5:33
"Preludio Obsesivo" [Obsessive Prelude] (instrumental, CD bonus track) – 3:40
"Otoño Medieval" [Medieval Autumn] (instrumental, CD bonus track) – 2:34

Personnel
Rata Blanca
Adrián Barilari – vocals
Walter Giardino – lead guitars 
Sergio Berdichevsky – rhythm guitars
Guillermo Sánchez – bass
Gustavo Rowek – drums, percussion
Hugo Bistolfi – keyboards

Production
 Mario Sanguinet – recording, mastering
 José Luis Botto – management
 Eduardo Rodríguez – management
 José Luis Massa – photography
 Roberto Ricci – executive producer
 Pablo Iotti – artwork
 Oscar Festa – artwork

References

1990 albums
Heavy metal albums by Argentine artists
PolyGram albums
Rata Blanca albums